Menesida is a genus of longhorn beetles of the subfamily Lamiinae, containing the following species:

 Menesida atricolor (Pic, 1925)
 Menesida bankaensis Breuning, 1951
 Menesida bicoloripes (Pic, 1925)
 Menesida carinifrons Aurivillius, 1922
 Menesida flavipennis Breuning, 1954
 Menesida fuscicornis Breuning, 1950
 Menesida fuscipennis Breuning, 1954
 Menesida marginalis Gahan, 1907
 Menesida nigripes Breuning, 1954
 Menesida nigrita Gahan, 1907
 Menesida planifrons  Tippmann, 1951
 Menesida rufula Breuning, 1954
 Menesida testaceipennis (Pic, 1922)

References

Saperdini